William Girdler (October 22, 1947 –  January 21, 1978) was an American filmmaker. In a span of six years, from 1972 to 1978, he directed nine feature films in such genres as horror and action. Girdler also wrote and produced three of his features, Abby, Sheba, Baby and The Manitou.

Career
Girdler, born in Louisville, Kentucky, started Studio One Productions in his early 20s and directed his first feature, a low-budget film entitled Asylum of Satan which was briefly released to theaters. Girdler's second effort was a slasher thriller entitled Three on a Meathook. Both Asylum of Satan and Three on a Meathook were filmed in his hometown, and although both films received little notice, they got the attention of Samuel Z. Arkoff and American International Pictures (AIP).

Girdler next directed three "blaxploitation" films. The first, in 1973, was a long-lost thriller titled The Zebra Killer starring Austin Stoker. By coincidence, another Louisville native, Rich Miles, appeared in this picture in a small role as the local cop who discovers some of the bodies. Girdler's next feature was an Exorcist clone titled Abby with Carol Speed in the lead role and co-starring William H. Marshall (from Blacula) and Oscar nominee Juanita Moore. Abby became Girdler's breakthrough film. The picture opened in 1974 to major box office success, earning nearly $9 million. Warner Brothers thought Abby was too derivative of The Exorcist and the film was suddenly pulled from theaters after two weeks. The last "blaxploitation" film Girdler directed was the Pam Grier vehicle Sheba, Baby and his first effort in the action genre. Sheba, Baby was another major hit in theaters, even though it is often cited as one of Pam Grier's weaker vehicles when compared to her similarly themed action films Coffy and Foxy Brown. Girdler was then finished with his contract with Arkoff and AIP.

Girdler's sixth feature film was another action-themed film reminiscent of The Killer Elite, starring Leslie Nielsen, in one of his more serious roles as an agent tracked by the government in the political thriller Project: Kill, which was given a limited theatrical release.

Grizzly, released in 1976, was Girdler's most financially successful film. A Jaws clone from start to finish, the film was about an oversized grizzly bear terrorizing a national park. The movie starred Christopher George, Andrew Prine and Richard Jaeckel and went on to become one of the most successful motion pictures of the year, earning an impressive $39 million worldwide. After this triumph, Grizzly's producer and distributor, Edward L. Montoro and Film Ventures International decided to keep the financial profits. Girdler (and the film's screenwriters/producers Harvey Flaxman and David Sheldon, who also worked with Girdler on previous films) sued Montoro and Film Ventures to have the profits returned. Girdler then directed Day of the Animals, another effort for Montoro which is sometimes cited as a sequel to Grizzly. The film had an all-star cast, including Christopher George, Lynda Day George, Richard Jaeckel, and Leslie Nielsen. It was Girdler's second approach to nature-versus-man films, but was not as successful as Grizzly.

The Manitou was the last film directed by Girdler. Based on a best-selling novel by Graham Masterton, and starring Tony Curtis and Susan Strasberg, The Manitou was perhaps Girdler's most expensive production. It was acquired by AVCO Embassy Pictures, released in 1978 and was also a major hit in theaters.

Death
He was killed in a helicopter crash in Manila, Philippines on January 21, 1978, while scouting locations for his 10th film project.

References

External links

1947 births
1978 deaths
Horror film directors
Writers from Louisville, Kentucky
Blaxploitation film directors
Film directors from Kentucky
Victims of helicopter accidents or incidents
Accidental deaths in the Philippines
Burials at Cave Hill Cemetery